Oliver Kegel (born 14 June 1961 in Berlin) is a West German-German sprint canoeist who competed from the mid-1980s to the early 1990s. Competing in two Summer Olympics, he won a gold medal in the K-4 1000 m event at Barcelona in 1992.

Kegel also won eight medals at the ICF Canoe Sprint World Championships with four golds (K-4 500 m: 1991, K-4 1000 m: 1993, K-4 10000 m: 1991, 1993), two silvers (K-4 500 m: 1993, K-4 1000 m: 1991), and two bronzes (K-4 1000 m: 1994, K-4 10000 m: 1987).

References
 
 
 
New York Times article on doping prior to the 1992 Summer Olympics featuring Hofmann.

External links
 
 

1961 births
Canoeists from Berlin
Canoeists at the 1984 Summer Olympics
Canoeists at the 1992 Summer Olympics
German male canoeists
Living people
Olympic canoeists of Germany
Olympic canoeists of West Germany
Olympic gold medalists for Germany
Olympic medalists in canoeing
ICF Canoe Sprint World Championships medalists in kayak
Medalists at the 1992 Summer Olympics